André Alexandre Antunes Pedrosa (born 12 April 1997) is a Portuguese professional footballer who plays for Vitória F.C. as a midfielder.

Club career
On 29 December 2016, Pedrosa made his professional debut with Vitória Setúbal in a 2016–17 Taça da Liga match against Arouca.

References

External links

Stats and profile at LPFP 

1997 births
Living people
Portuguese footballers
Association football midfielders
Primeira Liga players
Vitória F.C. players
Sportspeople from Barreiro, Portugal